Shock therapy may refer to:

Shock therapy (psychiatry)
Shock therapy (economics)

See also
Shock Treatment (disambiguation)
 Extracorporeal shockwave therapy